"Sexy Girl" is a 1995 song by Canadian reggae musician Snow, released as a single from his second album, Murder Love (1995).

Critical reception
Gil Robertson IV from Cash Box wrote, "This new single from Snow’s Murder Love disc is a winner. It has a stylized upbeat and highly danceable beat, and Snow’s rap resonates with a bouncy provocative flavor that will make it one of the party favorites of the summer."

Charts

References

External links
"Sexy Girl" music video

1995 songs
1995 singles
Snow (musician) songs
Songs written by Snow (musician)
East West Records singles